Richard Kriel (born 7 July 2000) is a South African rugby union player for the  in the United Rugby Championship .His regular position is fullback.

Kriel was named in the  squad for the 2021 Currie Cup Premier Division and 2021 Currie Cup Premier Division and for the  squad in the 2021–22 United Rugby Championship season.

References

South African rugby union players
2000 births
Living people
Rugby union fullbacks
Blue Bulls players
Bulls (rugby union) players
Rugby union players from Potchefstroom
Zebre Parma players
Rugby union wings